Mike Isom (born c. 1948) is a former American football coach. He served as the head football coach at the University of Central Arkansas from 1990 to 1999, compiling 
a record of 68–38–4 and winning an NAIA Division I Football National Championship in 1991.  A native of Conway, Arkansas, Isom played football at Conway High School, and then at Central Arkansas.

Isom retired from coaching after the 1999 season. He was replaced as head football coach by Clint Conque.

Head coaching record

College

References

1940s births
Living people
Year of birth uncertain
Central Arkansas Bears football coaches
Central Arkansas Bears football players
High school football coaches in Arkansas
People from Conway, Arkansas
Coaches of American football from Arkansas
Players of American football from Arkansas
Hall High School (Arkansas) alumni